Liene Fimbauere (born 30 January 1989) is an alpine skier from Latvia.  She competed for Latvia at the 2010 Winter Olympics.  Her best result was a 49th place in the slalom.

References

External links
 
 
 
 

1989 births
Living people
Latvian female alpine skiers
Olympic alpine skiers of Latvia
Alpine skiers at the 2010 Winter Olympics
University of Latvia alumni
21st-century Latvian women